Balan is a lost 1938 Indian Malayalam-language drama film produced by T. R. Sundaram under the banner of Modern Theatres, directed by S. Nottani and written by Muthukulam Raghavan Pillai. It is notable for being the first sound film in the Malayalam language, and the third feature film in Malayalam cinema after Vigathakumaran and Marthanda Varma. Based on the short story Vidhiyum Mrs. Nayarum by A. Sundaram. The film is a melodrama about the struggle of two orphaned children. The film stars K. K. Aroor in the title role and M. K. Kamalam as the female lead, with Master Madanagopal, M. V. Shanku, K. Gopinath, Alleppey Vincent and C. O. N. Nambiar in supporting roles.

The film was produced by T. R. Sundaram, a Salem-based producer under the banner of Modern Theatres. German cinematographer Bado Gushwalker handled the camera while Varghese and K.D. George did the editing. The film's music was composed by K. K. Aroor, himself, with lyrics written by Muthukulam Raghavan Pillai. Balan is the first Malayalam film to have a soundtrack. The sound of the film was recorded using German-made technology . The film features twenty-three songs. Balan was shot in Madras and on the sets of Powerful Studios. The filming of the film was done in five months.

Balan was released with high expectations on 19 January 1938. It was the only Malayalam film to be produced and released that year. Despite numerous technical flaws, it received critical acclaim, with praise for the film's social theme unlike the earlier films with sound in the other South Indian languages, which chose episodes either from history or mythology. The film was a major box office success, becoming the first commercially successful Malayalam film. Because only a few stills from the film and the songbook are known to survive, it is a lost film. K. K. Aroor and Alleppey Vincent also starred in the second Malayalam talkie Gnanambika two years later.

Plot
Balan and Sarasa, are children of Dr. Govindan Nair by his first wife. Meenakshi, the second wife, tortures Balan and Sarasa. She even plots to kill them and take over the entire wealth of Nair. Meenakshi is severely punished by Nair when he discovers her motives. Nair dies of a heart attack. Meenakshi marries a wicked city wastrel, Kittu Panicker, so Balan and Sarasa flee from home.

Barrister Prabhakara Menon accepts and raises Balan and Sarasa as if they were his own children. In the will executed by Nair before his death, all his wealth is assigned to Meenakshi on condition that she take care of his children.

When Meenakshi and Kittu Panicker discover the stipulations in the will, they trace out the children. Kittu Panicker kidnaps the children from Prabhakara Menon's home. Shanku discovers Meenakshi and Kittu Panciker's plans and rescues the children. He uses them in street shows. Balan and Sarasa escape from Shanku.

Sarasa is taken away by a labour contractor while Balan is asleep. She is forced to work in an estate. Sarasa grows up here. Balan also reaches the same estate as a labourer. This estate is owned by Barrister Prabhakara Menon.

Prabhakara Menon identifies Balan and Sarasa. Balan traces out the will executed by his father and Prabhakara Menon files suit against Meenakshi. She is tried by the court of law and punished. A furious Meenakshi shoots Prabhakara Menon, but the bullet from the pistol takes the life of Balan who jumps in between to save Menon. Menon marries Sarasa. They name their son, Balan. The film ends with Menon, and Sarasa paying homage at the tomb of Balan.

Cast

Master Madanagopal as young Balan
M. V. Shankar as Dr. Govindan Nair
K. Gopinath as Kittu Panicker
Alleppey Vincent as Shanku
C. O. N. Nambiar as Prabhakara Menon
K.N. Laxmikutty as Meenakshi
Baby Malathi as young Sarasa
A. B. Pious
Subhadra
Ammu
M.K.K Nambyar
Sivanandan
Parukkutty
Baby Kausalya
A. P Padmanabha Menon

Production
There were several attempts to make a talkie in Malayalam, right from the days Vigathakumaran (1928) got released. One among them, A. Sundaram Pillai, had an unpublished story entitled Vidhiyum Mrs. Nayarum (Mrs. Nair and the Fate) with him. He contacted several production houses to adapt this story into a film. Several of his attempts failed, but at last he got a letter from T. R. Sundaram, a Tamil-based producer informing him that he was ready to produce the film. T. R. Sundaram owned the production company Modern Theatres, which he established in 1936. A. Sundaram had already finished casting, which included several theatre artists from Malayalam. K. Kunjunair, credited as K. K. Aroor in the film, of the Kottakkal Nataka Samithi was selected to do the title role. M. K. Kamalam was chosen as the heroine.

A. Sundaram wanted himself to direct the film, but later agreed to sign S. Nottani as the director. Nottani rejected the screenplay of A. Sundaram and wanted to rewrite it. Eventually, he signed renowned writer Muthukulam Raghavan Pillai, who wrote the screenplay and dialogues, as well as lyrics for the songs. The filming was started on 17 August 1937 from Salem. After completing a length of 2000 feat, T. R. Sundaram dropped the project following differences in opinion with A. Sundaram. T. R. Sundaram had spent  30,000 on the project. A. Sundaram himself financed the project thereafter. Most parts of the film was shot from Powerful Studios. The filming was completed within five months, in December 1937. A. Sundaram could not find a distributor for many months. Later, Shyamala Pictures, Madras bought the rights and the film was released on 19 January 1938. The theatrical release poster of Balan read Malayalathile adyathe social padam vegam varunnu (The first social film in Malayalam is coming out soon).

Songs
Balan'''s music was composed by K. K. Aroor, who played the male lead, and Ibrahim. It had 23 songs, most of them recorded by the actors themselves. K. N. Lakshmi, K. K. Aroor, M. K. Kamalam and Master Madanagopan are the credited singers. Playback singing was not possible that time, so the producer had to sign actors those who could excel in singing also. Most of the songs followed popular Hindi and Tamil film tunes of the time. Gramaphone records of the songs were not produced. The most popular song was a solo by M. K. Kamalam "Jaathaka Doshathale", based on Chenjurutti raga. It was a direct copy of "Theyila Thottathle" by M. K. Radha from the Tamil film Sathi Leelavathi'' (1936). Lyrics for the songs were penned by Muthukulam Raghavan Pillai, who also wrote the screenplay and dialogues for the film.

Legacy 
The film was a milestone in Malayalam film history, not only for being the first talkie, but also for being one of the first commercially successful films. Through the film, Alleppey Vincent became the first "speaking person" of Malayalam cinema, K. K. Aroor the first "speaking hero" and M. K. Kamalam the first "speaking heroine". "Hello Mister" was the first recorded sound, which was in the voice of Alleppey Vincent. The film is considered lost; only the song book and a few stills survive to this day. The film also introduced many of early Malayalam cinema's recurring archetypes, including the evil step-mother and innocent orphans.

See also
 Malayalam cinema
 Vigathakumaran
 Marthanda Varma (film)

References

External links 
 http://www.malayalachalachithram.com/movie.php?i=3
 

1930s Malayalam-language films
1938 films
Melodrama films
Indian black-and-white films
Lost Indian films
Films shot in Chennai
Indian drama films
1938 drama films
1938 lost films
Lost drama films